The Texas is a historic house in Daphne, Alabama, U.S.. It was built as a hotel by William L. Howard in 1835. In 1894, it was purchased by William Dryer. It has been listed on the National Register of Historic Places since December 20, 1998.

References

External links

Hotel buildings completed in 1835
Houses in Baldwin County, Alabama
Hotel buildings on the National Register of Historic Places in Alabama